The 2008–09 Czech 1.liga season was the 16th season of the 1st Czech Republic Hockey League, the second level of ice hockey in the Czech Republic. 16 teams participated in the league, and HC Slovan Ustecti Lvi won the championship.

Regular season

Pre-Playoffs 
 HC Chrudim – HC Benátky nad Jizerou 0:3 (2:3 n.P., 2:3 n.V., 2:5)
 HC VCES Hradec Králové – SK Kadaň 3:1 (4:1, 3:2, 2:5, 4:2)
 HC Dukla Jihlava – HC Havířov 3:1 (3:1, 4:2, 1:2, 2:1)
 HC Olomouc – HC Rebel Havlíčkův Brod 3:1 (1:2, 7:2, 5:2, 1:0)

Playoffs

Quarterfinals

 HC Slovan Ústečtí Lvi – HC Benátky nad Jizerou 6:1 (1:0, 2:1, 3:0)
 HC Slovan Ústečtí Lvi – HC Benátky nad Jizerou 3:1 (1:0, 0:1, 2:0)
 HC Benátky nad Jizerou – HC Slovan Ústečtí Lvi 2:3 (0:0, 1:2, 1:1)
 HC Benátky nad Jizerou – HC Slovan Ústečtí Lvi 4:0 (3:0, 1:0, 0:0)
 HC Slovan Ústečtí Lvi – HC Benátky nad Jizerou 9:3 (4:0, 4:1, 1:2)
 HC Kometa Brno – HC Olomouc 4:1 (1:0, 3:0, 0:1)
 HC Kometa Brno – HC Olomouc 3:1 (2:1, 1:0, 0:0)
 HC Olomouc – HC Kometa Brno 2:4 (1:2, 1:1, 0:1)
 HC Olomouc – HC Kometa Brno 2:3 SN (0:0, 1:0, 1:2 – 0:0)
 KLH Chomutov – HC Dukla Jihlava 2:1 PP (0:0, 0:0, 1:1 – 1:0)
 KLH Chomutov – HC Dukla Jihlava 4:2 (2:0, 1:1, 1:1)
 HC Dukla Jihlava – KLH Chomutov 3:4 (0:0, 1:1, 2:3)
 HC Dukla Jihlava – KLH Chomutov 2:4 (1:2, 1:0, 0:2)
 HC Vrchlabí – HC VCES Hradec Králové 5:3 (2:2, 0:0, 3:1)
 HC Vrchlabí – HC VCES Hradec Králové 2:4 (1:1, 0:0, 1:3)
 HC VCES Hradec Králové – HC Vrchlabí 4:3 (1:1, 3:1, 0:1)
 HC VCES Hradec Králové – HC Vrchlabí 3:2 PP (1:0, 1:1, 0:1 – 1:0)
 HC Vrchlabí – HC VCES Hradec Králové 4:2 (1:0, 2:1, 1:1)
 HC VCES Hradec Králové – HC Vrchlabí 3:0 (0:0, 2:0, 1:0)

Semifinals 

 HC Kometa Brno –  KLH Chomutov 1:2 PP (0:1, 1:0, 0:0 – 0:1)
 HC Kometa Brno –  KLH Chomutov 4:2 (0:0, 2:1, 2:1)
 KLH Chomutov –  HC Kometa Brno 5:1 (3:0, 2:1, 0:0)
 KLH Chomutov –  HC Kometa Brno 2:6 (1:3, 0:3, 1:0)
 HC Kometa Brno –  KLH Chomutov 1:4 (0:0, 0:2, 1:2)
 KLH Chomutov –  HC Kometa Brno 1:2 SN (0:1, 1:0, 0:0 – 0:0 – 0:1)
 HC Kometa Brno – KLH Chomutov 3:0 (1:0, 0:0, 2:0)
 HC Slovan Ústečtí Lvi – HC VCES Hradec Králové 2:3 (0:1, 1:2, 1:0)
 HC Slovan Ústečtí Lvi – HC VCES Hradec Králové 3:2 SN (1:0, 0:1, 1:1 – 0:0)
 HC VCES Hradec Králové – HC Slovan Ústečtí Lvi 2:0 (0:0, 2:0, 0:0)
 HC VCES Hradec Králové – HC Slovan Ústečtí Lvi 1:2 (1:1, 0:1, 0:0)
 HC Slovan Ústečtí Lvi – HC VCES Hradec Králové 3:1 (1:0, 2:1, 0:0)
 HC VCES Hradec Králové – HC Slovan Ústečtí Lvi 4:6 (1:0, 1:3, 2:3)

Final
HC Slovan Ustecti Lvi – HC Kometa Brno 5–3, 3–1, 1–5, 1–3, 3–1, 2–1

Qualification round

External links
 Season on hockeyarchives.info

2008–09 in Czech ice hockey
Czech
Czech 1. Liga seasons